Žarko Nikolić (16 October 1936 – 22 August 2011) was a Yugoslav and Serbian footballer who played as a defender.

Career
Born in Novi Sad, Nikolić played for Vojvodina from 1954 to 1966, amassing over 200 appearances in the Yugoslav First League and helping them win the championship in the 1965–66 season. He subsequently moved abroad to Germany and joined Schalke 04, spending two seasons at the club. Before retiring from the game, Nikolić had a brief second spell with Vojvodina.

At international level, Nikolić was capped nine times for Yugoslavia. He represented his country at one European Nations' Cup (finishing runner-up in 1960) and one World Cup (1962). Nikolić was also a member of the team that won the gold medal at the 1960 Summer Olympics, but he did not play in any matches.

Honours

Club
Vojvodina
 Yugoslav First League: 1965–66

International
Yugoslavia
 Olympic Games: 1960
 European Nations' Cup: Runner-up 1960

References

External links
 
 

1960 European Nations' Cup players
1962 FIFA World Cup players
Association football defenders
Bundesliga players
Expatriate footballers in Germany
FC Schalke 04 players
FK Vojvodina players
Footballers at the 1960 Summer Olympics
Medalists at the 1960 Summer Olympics
Olympic footballers of Yugoslavia
Olympic gold medalists for Yugoslavia
Olympic medalists in football
Serbian footballers
Footballers from Novi Sad
Yugoslav expatriate footballers
Yugoslav expatriate sportspeople in Germany
Yugoslav First League players
Yugoslav footballers
Yugoslavia international footballers
1936 births
2011 deaths